Unlike most conventional mercury thermometers, a reversing thermometer is able to record a given temperature to be viewed at a later time.  If the thermometer is flipped upside down, the current temperature will be shown until it is turned upright again.  This was the primary device used by oceanographers to determine water temperatures below the surface of the ocean from around 1900 to 1970. 

It consists of a conventional bulb connected to a capillary in which a constriction is placed so that upon reversal the mercury column breaks off in a reproducible manner. The mercury runs down into a smaller bulb at the other end of the capillary, which is graduated to read temperature. A 360° turn in a locally widened portion of the capillary serves as a trap to prevent further addition of mercury if the thermometer is warmed and the mercury expands past the break-off point. The remote-reading potentialities of reversing thermometers make them particularly suitable for use in measuring subsea temperature as a function of pressure. In this application, both protected thermometers and unprotected thermometers are used, each of which is provided with an auxiliary thermometer. They are generally used in pairs in Nansen bottles. They are usually read to 0.01°C, and after the proper corrections have been applied, their readings are considered reliable to 0.02°C.

References

External links
Introduction to Physical Oceanography by Robert H. Stewart (Open Source Textbook)
Glossary of Meteorology (American Meteorological Society)

Thermometers